Malkus (Avestan: mahrkūša "The destroyer") is a Daeva in Zoroastrianism responsible for an unnaturally long winter.

In scripture

In the Bundahishn 
According to the Bundahishn he is a descendant of the Turanian Brādarōrēš and will appear at the end of the millennium.

He is listed among other enemies in Zoroastrian tradition, like Alexander, Agrēhrat and Zahak.

In the Denkard 
The Denkard places Malkus' appearance in the fifth century of Ushedar's millennium.

References 

Daevas